Jashore Zilla School is the fifth oldest school in Asia, the second oldest in Bangladesh, and the oldest school in Jashore southwest of Bangladesh. It was established on 3 February 1838 and named Jessore Zilla School after 1872. Though the school was established under a government order, it was founded with donations from local people. On 27 January 1845, the wife of the zamindar of Naldi Pargana made an annual grant of Tk 300 for running the school. The school received financial and other help from persons like Babu Ramratan, Nilkamal Pal Chowdhury, Raja Barodakanta Roy, Darakanath Thakur, Kunjalal Thakur, Moulavi Abdullah, Mohammad Karim, Pranonath Chowdhury, Shukh Das Roy, Radhamohan Gosh Chowdhury, and Kalikanta Poddar. In 2018 the renamed in English  as Jashore Zilla School along with city and district name.

History

The school was launched with 132 students in the bungalow of Rani Kattayani of Naldi. Later, Jessore Zilla School acquired 7.8 acres of land in the Kharki-Jessore mouza and was shifted there after building new houses.

Jessore Zilla School introduced the teaching of the Persian language in 1874 and of Urdu after 1947. Urdu was the medium of instruction for non-Bengali students of the school. The Pakistan government undertook the development of the school under a pilot project in 1963. That year a new stream of science group alongside the existing humanities group was introduced in the school. The commerce group was introduced in 1965 and in 1970, students got the opportunity to register in the fine arts group. The school has common rooms, a science laboratory and a library.

The first headmaster Mr. J Smith worked from 1838 to 1848 in the first term and then from 1851 to 1865 in another.

Student life
The school and its students have a good record of performance in extracurricular activities including the publication of a magazine titled Jagaran. The students take an active part in the scouts, and red-crescent movement. They also participate in sports competitions and national debates including some on TV.

The school runs in two shifts. In 2000, it had 1,453 students, of whom 752 were in the morning shift (7-12 am) and 701 in the day shift (12.20-5.35 pm). Now, the number is almost 2000. The number of teachers was 44, of whom 39 were men. The results of the students in public examinations are excellent. The library has a collection of about 5,000 books and many of these books are very rare.

Jessore Zilla School has nine buildings including a two-storied students' hostel, an administrative building, and residential quarters for the employees. It also has a mosque, a big auditorium, a health complex, 2 bicycle garages, a playground, and two ponds.

Notable alumni
M. Shamsher Ali, physicist
Mohammad Sharif Husain, academic and philanthropist
Mashiur Rahman, politician 
Mosharraf Hossain, politician 
Muhammad Shahidullah, linguist
 Md.Kowsar Ali-Bangladesh National Football & Hockey Players & National Hockey Coach
Hafiz Ahmed Mazumder, businessman and politician

See also
List of Zilla Schools of Bangladesh

References

External links 
Jashore Zilla School Website
 Banglapedia

Educational institutions established in 1838
Schools in Jessore District
1838 establishments in India
Boys' schools in Bangladesh
Educational institutions of Khulna Division